Paphiopedilum tranlienianum is a species of orchid endemic to Vietnam.

References

External links 

tranlienianum
Endemic orchids of Vietnam